Three Days and a Child (translit. Shlosha Yamim Veyeled) is a 1967 Israeli drama film directed by Uri Zohar.  It is a modernist adaptation of a short story by the same name by A. B. Yehoshua and draws on the techniques and sensibilities of French New Wave cinema.

Plot
Eli (Oded Kotler) is a young graduate student in math who lives with his girlfriend in Jerusalem.  He agrees to babysit Shai (Shai Oshorov), the young son of his beloved former girlfriend, Noa (Judith Solé), and her husband.  Eli and Shai spend three days touring Jerusalem, as Eli relives painful memories of his life with Noa on the kibbutz and her subsequent rejection of him.  Uncertain if he is the child's father, Eli's feelings towards Shay are ambivalent and for unexplained reasons (perhaps resentment, anger, jealousy, alienation, boredom, or guilt) he plays dangerous games with the boy.

Cast
 Oded Kotler - Eli
 Shai Oshorov - Shai
 Judith Solé - Noa
 Misha Asherov - Shai's father
 Illi Gorlitzky - Zvi
 Germaine Unikovsky - Yael (as Jermain Unikovsky)
 Stella Ivni - Neighbor
 Baruch David - Neighbor's husband
 Shoshana Doar - Yael's mother
 Nissan Yatir - Yael's father

Themes
According to one student of Israeli film, Three Days and a Child "ostensibly . . .sets up a dichotomy between [Eli's] alienated life in Jerusalem and the kibbutz idyll. His life in the city is characterized by loneliness, despair, estrangement from his lover and a mise-en-scène that stresses desolation, graves and thorns. In the hero’s consciousness, his kibbutz past is a memory of first love, flowering fields and flowing water. Yet . . . this perception of the protagonist is not so clear cut: life in the kibbutz wasn’t so harmonious, whereas his life in Jerusalem was not so terrible."

Critical reception
Three Days and a Child was a great success, critically and commercially, selling some 308,000 tickets. It was entered into the 1967 Cannes Film Festival where it was nominated for Best Film and Oded Kotler won the award for Best Actor.

References

External links

1967 films
1960s Hebrew-language films
Films about the kibbutz
1967 drama films
Israeli black-and-white films
Films directed by Uri Zohar
Israeli drama films